ICI-63197 is a phosphodiesterase inhibitor.

References

Phosphodiesterase inhibitors